Debreceni EAC may refer to:

 Debreceni EAC (football), the football section of the Hungarian multi-sports club
 Debreceni EAC (basketball), the basketball section of the Hungarian multi-sports club